South Amboy is a suburban city in Middlesex County, in the U.S. state of New Jersey, located on Raritan Bay. As of the 2020 United States Census, the city's population was 9,411.

South Amboy and Perth Amboy, across the Raritan River, are collectively referred to as The Amboys. Signage for exit 11 on the New Jersey Turnpike refers to "The Amboys" as a destination.

History
First settled by the Lenape Native Americans, who called the area around Perth Amboy by the name "Ompoge" (meaning "level ground"), the settlement ultimately became a key port for commerce between Lower New York Bay and Philadelphia, connected first by stagecoach and eventually by railroad. When settled by Europeans in 1684, the city was named New Perth in honor of James Drummond, Earl of Perth, one of the associates of a company of Scottish proprietaries. The Algonquian language name was corrupted to Ambo, or Point Amboy, and eventually a combination of the native and colonial names was used.

South Amboy has passed through three of the five types of New Jersey municipalities. It was first mentioned on May 28, 1782, in minutes of the Board of chosen freeholders as having been formed from Perth Amboy Township. It was formally incorporated as a township by the Township Act of 1798 on February 21, 1798. Over the next 90 years, portions split off to form Monroe Township (April 9, 1838), Madison Township (March 2, 1869; later renamed as Old Bridge Township) and Sayreville Township (April 6, 1876; later Borough of Sayreville). As of February 25, 1888, South Amboy borough was formed, replacing South Amboy Township. On April 11, 1908, South Amboy was incorporated as a city, replacing South Amboy borough, confirmed by a referendum held on July 21, 1908.

Ammunition explosions
As a result of South Amboy's strategic location as a transportation hub, the city has been heavily damaged by military explosives in two major incidents. The 1918 explosions occurred during World War I at the Gillespie Shell Loading Plant, just south of the town. The 1950 explosion struck as Healing Lighterage Company dockworkers were transferring ammunition from a freight train onto barges. Both disasters killed dozens and injured hundreds of local victims, damaged hundreds of South Amboy buildings, required emergency declarations of martial law, and scattered wide areas of ammunition remnants that continue to surface occasionally.

Geography
According to the United States Census Bureau, the city had a total area of 2.68 square miles (6.95 km2), including 1.54 square miles (3.98 km2) of land and 1.15 square miles (2.97 km2) of water (42.76%). South Amboy is bordered by land with Sayreville to the south and west, by Perth Amboy to the north (across the Raritan River), and Staten Island to the east (across the Raritan Bay in New York City).

Area codes 732 and 848 are used in South Amboy. The city had been in area code 908, until January 1, 1997, when 908 was split forming area code 732. South Amboy has an enclave of apartments near Kohl's in Sayreville, whose residents use a South Amboy mailing address. The Melrose and Morgan sections of Sayreville and the Laurence Harbor section of Old Bridge also use the South Amboy Zip Code of 08879.  Mechanicsville, White's Dock, and Thomas J. Dohany Homes are neighborhoods in the city.

Demographics
As The New York Times said of South Amboy in 2000: "The population mix has not changed much since the beginning of the 20th century, when Irish and Polish immigrants came to work on the three railroads that crisscrossed the city." South Amboy remains a strong enclave of Polish ethnicity, including 21% of its population in the 2000 census, and the historic Sacred Heart Church and School.

2010 Census

The Census Bureau's 2006–2010 American Community Survey showed that (in 2010 inflation-adjusted dollars) median household income was $61,566 (with a margin of error of +/− $6,388) and the median family income was $80,815 (+/− $4,285). Males had a median income of $54,000 (+/− $5,767) versus $49,303 (+/− $4,574) for females. The per capita income for the borough was $31,590 (+/− $2,232). About 10.2% of families and 9.0% of the population were below the poverty line, including 15.7% of those under age 18 and 5.5% of those age 65 or over.

2000 Census
As of the 2000 United States Census there were 7,913 people, 2,967 households, and 2,041 families residing in the city. The population density was 5,102.1 people per square mile (1,971.1/km2). There were 3,110 housing units at an average density of 2,005.3 per square mile (774.7/km2). The racial makeup of the city was 94.22% White, 0.86% African American, 0.19% Native American, 1.38% Asian, 0.03% Pacific Islander, 1.71% from other races, and 1.62% from two or more races. Hispanic or Latino of any race were 6.75% of the population.

There were 2,967 households, out of which 32.2% had children under the age of 18 living with them, 48.8% were married couples living together, 14.5% had a female householder with no husband present, and 31.2% were non-families. 25.9% of all households were made up of individuals, and 12.3% had someone living alone who was 65 years of age or older. The average household size was 2.65 and the average family size was 3.22.

In the city the population was spread out, with 24.3% under the age of 18, 7.7% from 18 to 24, 32.9% from 25 to 44, 21.5% from 45 to 64, and 13.6% who were 65 years of age or older. The median age was 37 years. For every 100 females, there were 95.5 males. For every 100 females age 18 and over, there were 92.0 males.

The median income for a household in the city was $50,529, and the median income for a family was $62,029. Males had a median income of $42,365 versus $29,737 for females. The per capita income for the city was $23,598. About 6.7% of families and 7.4% of the population were below the poverty line, including 10.6% of those under age 18 and 6.0% of those age 65 or over.

Government

Local government
South Amboy is governed within the Faulkner Act, formally known as the Optional Municipal Charter Law, under the Mayor-Council system of municipal government. The city is one of 71 municipalities (of the 564) statewide governed under this form. The governing body is comprised of the Mayor and the five-member City Council. The mayor is elected directly by the voters. The City Council is comprised of five members, two of whom are elected on an at-large basis while three are elected from wards. All members of the governing body are elected in partisan elections to serve four-year terms of office on a staggered basis in even-numbered years as part of the November general election, with the three ward seats up for election together and the two at-large seats and the mayoral seat up for vote together two years later.

, the Mayor of South Amboy is Democrat Fred Henry, whose term of office ends December 31, 2022. Members of the City Council are Council President Michael "Mickey" Gross (D, 2022; at-large), Council Vice President Christine Noble (D, 2022; at-large), Zusette Dato (D, 2024; Third Ward), Brian H. McLaughlin (D, 2024; First Ward) and Thomas B. Reilly (D, 2024; Second Ward).

In February 2015, the City Council appointed Thomas Reilly to fill the Second Ward expiring in December 2016 that became vacant when Christine Noble took office in an at-large seat. In the 2015 November general election, Reilly was elected to serve the balance of the term of office.

Following the death of Russell Stillwagon in June 2010, after serving nearly two decades on the City Council, Donald Applegate was chosen the following month by council members from among three names proposed to fill the vacancy representing the First Ward.

Federal, state and county representation
South Amboy is located in the 6th Congressional District and is part of New Jersey's 19th state legislative district.

 

Middlesex County is governed by a Board of County Commissioners, whose seven members are elected at-large on a partisan basis to serve three-year terms of office on a staggered basis, with either two or three seats coming up for election each year as part of the November general election. At an annual reorganization meeting held in January, the board selects from among its members a commissioner director and deputy director. , Middlesex County's Commissioners (with party affiliation, term-end year, and residence listed in parentheses) are 
Commissioner Director Ronald G. Rios (D, Carteret, term as commissioner ends December 31, 2024; term as commissioner director ends 2022),
Commissioner Deputy Director Shanti Narra (D, North Brunswick, term as commissioner ends 2024; term as deputy director ends 2022),
Claribel A. "Clary" Azcona-Barber (D, New Brunswick, 2022),
Charles Kenny (D, Woodbridge Township, 2022),
Leslie Koppel (D, Monroe Township, 2023),
Chanelle Scott McCullum (D, Piscataway, 2024) and 
Charles E. Tomaro (D, Edison, 2023).
Constitutional officers are
County Clerk Nancy Pinkin (D, 2025, East Brunswick),
Sheriff Mildred S. Scott (D, 2022, Piscataway) and 
Surrogate Claribel Cortes (D, 2026; North Brunswick).

Politics
As of November 6, 2018, there were a total of 5,876 registered voters in South Amboy, of which 2,948 (50.%) submitted ballots in the last General Election. Incumbent Mayor Fred Henry (1,490) secured his third term by defeating Republican candidate Peter Pisar (923) and independent amateur Brandon Russell (403).

Of the 5,876 registered voters: 2,410 (41.0%) were registered as Democrats, 658 (11.2%) were registered as Republicans and 2,803 (47.7%) were registered as Unaffiliated. There were 3 voters registered as Libertarians or Greens.

In the 2012 presidential election, Democrat Barack Obama received 55.6% of the vote (1,790 cast), ahead of Republican Mitt Romney with 42.7% (1,373 votes), and other candidates with 1.7% (54 votes), among the 3,269 ballots cast by the city's 5,491 registered voters (52 ballots were spoiled), for a turnout of 59.5%. In the 2008 presidential election, Democrat Barack Obama received 50.8% of the vote (1,875 cast), ahead of Republican John McCain with 46.6% (1,722 votes) and other candidates with 1.7% (64 votes), among the 3,693 ballots cast by the city's 5,382 registered voters, for a turnout of 68.6%. In the 2004 presidential election, Democrat John Kerry received 52.4% of the vote (1,784 ballots cast), outpolling Republican George W. Bush with 46.0% (1,566 votes) and other candidates with 0.7% (37 votes), among the 3,405 ballots cast by the city's 4,971 registered voters, for a turnout percentage of 68.5.

In the 2013 gubernatorial election, Republican Chris Christie received 65.0% of the vote (1,341 cast), ahead of Democrat Barbara Buono with 33.4% (689 votes), and other candidates with 1.6% (33 votes), among the 2,104 ballots cast by the city's 5,486 registered voters (41 ballots were spoiled), for a turnout of 38.4%. In the 2009 gubernatorial election, Republican Chris Christie received 52.7% of the vote (1,288 ballots cast), ahead of  Democrat Jon Corzine with 35.4% (865 votes), Independent Chris Daggett with 9.2% (226 votes) and other candidates with 1.7% (41 votes), among the 2,445 ballots cast by the city's 5,298 registered voters, yielding a 46.1% turnout.

Education
The South Amboy Public Schools serve students in pre-kindergarten through twelfth grade. As of the 2020–21 school year, the district, comprised of two schools, had an enrollment of 1,100 students and 81.0 classroom teachers (on an FTE basis), for a student–teacher ratio of 13.6:1. Schools in the district (with 2020–21 enrollment data from the National Center for Education Statistics) are 
South Amboy Elementary School with 514 students in grades PreK-5 and 
South Amboy Middle High School with 559 students in grades 6-12.

Eighth grade students from all of Middlesex County are eligible to apply to attend the high school programs offered by the Middlesex County Vocational and Technical Schools, a county-wide vocational school district that offers full-time career and technical education at Middlesex County Academy in Edison, the Academy for Allied Health and Biomedical Sciences in Woodbridge Township and at its East Brunswick, Perth Amboy and Piscataway technical high schools, with no tuition charged to students for attendance.

Raritan Bay Catholic Preparatory—Sacred Heart School was a parochial elementary school opened in 1895 and serving Pre-K–3 to eighth grade that operated under the auspices of the Roman Catholic Diocese of Metuchen, until it was closed in June 2016 due to insufficient enrollment. Cardinal McCarrick High School closed at the end of the 2014–2015 school year, in the wake of an increasing financial deficit.

Transportation

Roads and highways

Several major roads and highways traverse the city. These include portions of U.S. Route 9, Route 35 and CR 615, 621, 670, 684, 686, 688. Three Garden State Parkway exits (123–125) are just beyond the city's western border.

Public transportation
The South Amboy station provides frequent service on NJ Transit's North Jersey Coast Line, with most northbound trains heading to Newark Penn Station, Secaucus Junction and Penn Station in Midtown Manhattan and some heading to Hoboken Terminal.

NJ Transit local bus service is available on the 815 and 817 routes.

Plans for ferry service to Lower and Midtown Manhattan were announced in November 2018. In June 2020, the project received $5.3 million in federal funding for construction of a terminal near the train station.

The Raritan River Railroad provided passenger service to the city from 1888 to 1938. The railroad is now defunct along this part of the line. Proposals have been made to use the line as a light rail route.

Notable people

People who were born in, residents of, or otherwise closely associated with South Amboy include:

 Don Campbell (1916–1991), tackle who played for two NFL seasons
 Allie Clark (1923–2012), former New York Yankee
 Richard Field Conover (1858–1930), tennis player, lawyer and real estate manager
 Craig Coughlin (born 1958), New Jersey General Assembly member who has represented the 19th Legislative District since 2010
 Greg Evigan (born 1953), actor best known for appearing on the TV series B. J. and the Bear and My Two Dads
 John H. Froude (born 1930), politician who served in the New Jersey General Assembly from 1972 to 1980
 Monroe Green (–1996), businessman and long-time advertising director of The New York Times
 Harold G. Hoffman (1896–1954), mayor, congressman, and governor, for whom South Amboy Elementary School is named
 Benjamin Franklin Howell (1844–1933), banker and congressman, buried in Christ Church Cemetery
 Jack McKeon (born 1930), manager of the 2003 World Series Champion Florida Marlins
 Johnny O'Brien (born 1930) and Eddie O'Brien (1930–2014), twin baseball players for the Pittsburgh Pirates
 Charles Pettit (1736–1806), lawyer, merchant, and delegate to the Congress of the Confederation
 Thomas J. Scully (1864–1921), mayor and congressman
 Elmer Stout (1929–2013), football player
 Marques Townes (born 1995), basketball player for the Loyola Ramblers men's basketball team, who transferred out of Cardinal McCarrick after his sophomore year
 Ted Weiss (1927–1992), politician who served in the United States House of Representatives for New York from 1977 until his death in 1992
 Timothy Wiltsey (1985–1991), child murder victim whose mother was convicted 25 years later, a conviction vacated on appeal in 2021 by the state Supreme Court

In popular culture
Scenes from the 1985 Woody Allen movie The Purple Rose of Cairo were filmed in the former Raritan Diner.

Scenes from the 2000 film Coyote Ugly starring Piper Perabo were filmed in South Amboy and the main character is from the city.

References

External links

 South Amboy official website
 Middlesex County webpage for South Amboy
 Sadie Pope Dowdell Library
 South Amboy Police Department
 South Amboy Public Schools
 
  Data for the South Amboy Public Schools, National Center for Education Statistics
 South Amboy First Aid & Safety Squad

 
1798 establishments in New Jersey
Cities in Middlesex County, New Jersey
Faulkner Act (mayor–council)
Populated places established in 1798
Raritan Bayshore
Jersey Shore communities in Middlesex County